Britta Carlson (born 3 March 1978) is a German former football midfielder who played in the Frauen Bundesliga for Hamburger SV, Turbine Potsdam and VfL Wolfsburg. She was capped 31 times for the Germany women's national football team.

Club career

Carlson won the UEFA Women's Cup with Turbine Potsdam in 2005, as well as the 2006 Bundesliga and the Frauen DFB Pokal in 2005 and 2006. In October 2008, following a season with Wolfsburg, Carlson retired from football. She had been plagued by a persistent knee injury.

She subsequently joined the coaching staff at Wolfsburg and served as an ambassador for the 2011 FIFA Women's World Cup in Germany.

International career

In 31 appearances for the senior Germany team Carlson hit four goals and collected a winners' medal from UEFA Women's Euro 2005. Her debut came on 4 March 2004 in a 1–0 defeat to China in Fürth, and she won her last cap on 12 March 2007 in the 3–0 win over Denmark.

Carlson was named as an alternate for the 2004 Olympics in Athens, and was disappointed to be overlooked for the 2007 FIFA Women's World Cup squad.

Honours

Germany
UEFA Women's Championship: Winner 2005

References

External links

DFB profile

1978 births
Living people
German women's footballers
1. FFC Turbine Potsdam players
Sportspeople from Kiel
UEFA Women's Championship-winning players
Women's association football defenders
Women's association football midfielders
Footballers from Schleswig-Holstein
Germany women's international footballers